Maxim Bolotin (born 6 August 1982) is a Russian former competitive ice dancer. With Oksana Domnina, he won the bronze medal at the 2002 Russian Junior Figure Skating Championships, placed 7th at the 2002 World Junior Figure Skating Championships, and placed 4th at the 2001–2002 ISU Junior Grand Prix Final. After that partnership ended, he teamed up with Olga Orlova and won additional medals on the ISU Junior Grand Prix circuit. 

Bolotin is now working as a coach.

Programs

With Orlova

With Domnina

Results 
JGP: Junior Grand Prix

With Orlova

With Domnina

With Litvinenko

References

External links 
 
 

Russian male ice dancers
1982 births
Living people
Sportspeople from Yekaterinburg